The following is a list of some of the largest buildings that are considered palaces in terms by area. The title of the "world's largest palace" is both difficult to award and controversial, as different countries use different standards to claim that their palace is the largest in the world.

The title of world's largest royal domain, as measured by the total area of the property, goes to Balmoral Castle in Scotland. The castle's grounds cover 20,000 hectares (50,000 acres), or 

It was the winter residence of the Dalai Lama until 1959.

In the castle category, Prague and Malbork castles claim to be world's largest. However, despite its singular name, Prague Castle is not a single building. Like the Forbidden City, it comprises a number of palaces, temples, and halls (constructed over several centuries) that share a common defensive wall.

Faux palaces
While many buildings carry the title of palace, they either are no longer, or were never intended to be, used as a royal residence, a sovereign residence or a bishop residence.

Romania's Palace of the Parliament contains  of floorspace, it was never a royal residence, as Romania's last monarch was forced to abdicate in 1947, but it was the palace intended to be used by president Nicolae Ceausescu, Romania's supreme ruler and dictator.

Britain's Palace of Westminster was built in the Middle Ages as a royal residence. It served as the principal residence of the monarch until 1522, when Henry VIII moved his court to the newly acquired Palace of Whitehall. Since that time, the palace at Westminster has been used by the House of Lords, the House of Commons and various courts. The majority of the medieval palace was destroyed by fire in 1834, with construction of the current building starting in 1840. The palace which now stands on the site was designed specifically for parliamentary use, however it is the property of the monarch in right of the Crown and retains its status as a royal residence. Very little of the medieval palace survived, but the most significant is Westminster Hall, built in 1097 during the reign of William II.

Converted palaces
Several palaces are former royal residences that reached their current grand sizes after they ceased being used as royal residences, and were converted to some other purpose.

The best example of such subsequent expansion is the Louvre Palace. As a royal residence, it was much smaller than the current Louvre Museum. The Louvre Palace was abandoned as a royal residence in 1682, when Louis XIV moved his court to the Palace of Versailles. The Louvre Palace was relegated to the role of displaying royal collections and hosting administrative services, and over the centuries, it went through several renovations, expansions and additions, including a significant one as an imperial project during the Second French Empire in the 19th century. It reached its current size of  only in 1988, as the modern Louvre Museum.

Russia's Winter Palace and its annexes were not expanded after the Russian Revolution, but the State Hermitage Museum also occupies other buildings, which add to the size of the museum but not to the palace. The Winter Palace contained  of floorspace as a royal residence. However, the modern Hermitage Museum complex, centered on the Winter Palace, contains  of floorspace. That includes the Small and the Old Hermitage buildings that were annexes to the main palace, which were used by the Imperial Court and are part of the palace complex. The same is true of the New Hermitage, which has been used as a museum for the Imperial collections ever since it was built. All three Hermitages and the Hermitage Theatre can thus be considered both independent buildings and wings of the Winter Palace.

Despite a size that overshadows most other great palaces in Europe, the Winter Palace does not contain as much floorspace since most of the state apartments in the northern and the eastern wings are two floors high.

Uninhabited palaces
With  of floorspace, the Royal Palace of Madrid is often considered the largest functioning palace in Europe, as it is still used for state functions. Although Spanish monarchs once occupied it, the current King of Spain does not, instead living at the much smaller Palace of Zarzuela.

Although notably smaller than several other palaces throughout the world, with only  of floorspace, the Royal Palace of Stockholm also claims to be "the largest palace in the world still used for its original purpose." Yet, like the Royal Palace of Madrid, it is not currently occupied, with Swedish monarchs instead occupying Drottningholm Palace.

Guinness World Record
While numerous claimants under the various measurements can be recognized, to be considered for the Guinness World Record the palace must have once been intended for use as a royal residence. This is controversial as the definition of a palace is the official residence of a sovereign, chief of state (as a monarch or a president), archbishop, bishop. Furthermore, only the combined area of all floors in the palace (a measurement commonly known as floorspace) is considered.

According to the Guinness World Records, Forbidden City holds the "largest palace in the world".

Largest former palace complexes

In ancient times palace buildings could be as large or even larger than existing palace buildings. One example is
the palace of Knossos on the Greek island of Crete. The palace, which started construction in 2000 BC, reached its largest size in 1500 BC with a size of 20,000 m2 (215,278.208 ft²) and 1,300 rooms.

The Malkata palace complex was built by the Pharaoh Amenhotep III in the 14th Century BC. The size of the palace complex is unknown, but it contained a T-shaped artificial lake covering an area of at least 2 km2 (3.6 km2 according to some estimates). The size of the main palace itself was 30,000 m2.

The Basileia (royal quarter) of Alexandria is estimated to have covered an area of around 200 hectares (2,000,000 m2), though its exact size is uncertain. According to Strabo it took up a fourth or maybe even a third of the entire city. The complex included multiple palaces and royal residences, parks and gardens, the famous library of Alexandria, royal tombs (including the tomb of Alexander the Great), temples, a theatre, a gymnasium, a zoo, a citadel, a prison, the royal treasury and guest apartments.

The Roman emperor Hadrian's Villa at Tivoli, Italy was a complex of over 30 buildings constructed between 118 and the 130s AD, covering an area of at least 250 acres of which much is still unexcavated. The villa was the greatest Roman example of an Alexandrian garden, recreating a sacred landscape. The complex included palaces, several thermae, theatre, temples, libraries, state rooms, and quarters for courtiers, praetorians, and slaves.

When Roman emperor Nero's "Golden House" (Domus Aurea) was built after the great fire of AD 64, the buildings covered up to 300 acres. The main villa of the complex had more than 300 rooms.

In 200 BC, the Weiyang Palace was built at the request of the Emperor Gaozu of Han, under the supervision of his prime minister, Xiao He. The palace survived until the Tang dynasty, when it was burnt down by marauding invaders en route to the Tang capital, Chang'an. It was the largest palace complex ever built on Earth, covering , which is 6.7 times the size of the current Forbidden City, or 11 times the size of the Vatican City.

The Daming Palace was the imperial palace complex of the Tang dynasty in Chang'an. It served as the imperial residence of the Tang emperors for more than 220 years. In 634, the Emperor Taizong of Tang launched the construction of the Daming Palace at Longshou Plateau. He ordered the construction of the summer palace for his retired father, the Emperor Gaozu of Tang, as an act of filial piety. However, the Emperor Gaozu grew ill and never witnessed the palace's completion before his death in 635, and construction halted thereafter. Wu Zetian commissioned the court architect Yan Liben to design the palace in 660, and construction commenced once again in 662. In 663, the construction of the palace was completed under the reign of the Emperor Gaozong of Tang. The Emperor Gaozong had launched the extension of the palace with the construction of the Hanyuan Hall in 662, which was finished in 663. On 5 June 663, the Tang imperial family began to relocate from the Taiji Palace into the yet to be completed Daming Palace, which became the new seat of the imperial court and political center of the empire. The area of the palace complex was 3.11 km2.

Comparison of world's largest palaces

References 

Palaces
Palace
History-related lists of superlatives